The 2012 ADAC GT Masters season was the sixth season of the ADAC GT Masters, the grand tourer-style sports car racing founded by the German automobile club ADAC. It began on 30 March at Motorsport Arena Oschersleben and finished on 30 September at Hockenheim after eight double-header meetings. Sebastian Asch and Maximilian Götz became the champions in the drivers' standings.

Entry list

Race calendar and results

Standings

References

External links
 
 ADAC GT Masters on RacingSportCars
 2012 ADAC GT Masters season on Speedsport Magazine

ADAC GT Masters season
ADAC GT Masters seasons